Mahfuz (Arabic: محفوظ, Harari: ማሕፉዝ) is an Islamic masculine given name that may refer to:
Mahfuz (died 1517), Emir of Harar, medieval Somali territory
Mahfuz Ahmed, Bangladeshi actor, presenter, model and producer
Mahfuz Omar (born 1957), Malaysian politician
Mahfuz Anam (born 1950), Bangladeshi editor and publisher
Ahmad Mahfuz Umar (born 1936), Yemeni writer
Muhammad Mahfuz (born 1944), Pakistani soldier

See also 
 Mahfouz, a surname

Arabic masculine given names